Chipolin or variation, may refer to:

 281068 Chipolin, a main-belt asteroid discovered in 2006 and named after Chi Po-Lin
 Chi Po-lin (1964–2017; aka Po Lin Chi, Chi Polin), Taiwanese documentary filmmaker
 Cipolin (also spelled chipolin), a type of marble popular with Ancient Romans and Greeks

See also
 Cipollone (Chipollone)
 Cipollina (disambiguation) (Chipollina)
 Cipollini (disambiguation) (Chipollini)
 Cipollino (disambiguation) (Chipollino)
 Cipolla (disambiguation) (Chipolla)